Javicia Leslie (born May 30, 1987) is an American actress. After landing her first major role in the Lifetime film "Swim At Your Own Risk, (2016), she appeared as a series regular on the BET drama The Family Business (2018–present) and the CBS comedy-drama God Friended Me (2018–2020). She also starred as the lead of the film Always a Bridesmaid (2019). In 2021, Leslie began portraying the title role of The CW superhero series Batwoman for the second and third season.

Early life and education 
Leslie was born into a military family on May 30, 1987, in Augsburg, Germany. Her family moved to Maryland where she grew up in Upper Marlboro. She attended Hampton University where she appeared in productions of Seven Guitars, for colored girls, and Chicago.

Career 
Following her graduation, Leslie moved to Los Angeles to pursue an acting career.

She appeared in the BET series The Family Business and was in the 2019 film Always a Bridesmaid. She previously appeared as a series regular on God Friended Me from 2018 to 2020, where she portrayed the sister of Brandon Micheal Hall's character.

In 2020, Leslie was cast in the title role of Batwoman following the departure of original lead Ruby Rose. She plays Ryan Wilder, an original character created for the show, who takes up the mantle of Batwoman in the second season.

Personal life 
Leslie is bisexual. She is a Christian and trained in Muay Thai.

Filmography

Film

Television

References

External links 
 

1987 births
Living people
21st-century American actresses
Actors from Augsburg
German people of African-American descent
Actresses from Maryland
Hampton University alumni
People from Upper Marlboro, Maryland
Bisexual actresses
LGBT African Americans
German LGBT actors
LGBT Christians
LGBT people from Maryland
African-American Christians
21st-century African-American women
21st-century African-American people
American bisexual actors